Austroblechnum colensoi, synonym Blechnum colensoi, also known as Colenso's hard fern, waterfall fern or peretao is a species of fern native to New Zealand. It is distributed throughout the North, South and Stewart Islands.

Austroblechnum colensoi is usually found in dark areas with good access to water, such as steep banks, river gorges and rocky overhangs.

References

Blechnaceae
Ferns of New Zealand